The 203rd Tactical Fighter Squadron is a squadron of the 2nd Air Wing of the Japan Air Self-Defense Force (JASDF) based at Chitose Air Base, in Hokkaido Prefecture, Japan. It is equipped with Mitsubishi F-15J/DJ and Kawasaki T-4 aircraft.

History
The squadron was formed at Chitose Air Base at Hokkaido in June 1964 as part of the 2nd Air Wing. It was the third of the JASDF's F-104 units to form. It took over Quick Reaction Alert duties from the North American F-86D Sabre-equipped 103rd Squadron.

On March 24th, 1984 the squadron updated from the F-104 to the F-15J/DJ.

Tail markings
The squadron's aircraft have a stylized 203 with a red line, and a bear resembling a panda.

Aircraft operated

Fighter aircraft
 Lockheed F-104J/DJ Starfighter (1964-1983)
 Mitsubishi F-15J (1983-present)

Liaison aircraft
 Lockheed  T-33A (1964-1992)
 Kawasaki T-4 (1992-present)

In popular culture
The squadron appeared in the 1990 film Best Guy.

See also
 Fighter units of the Japan Air Self-Defense Force

References

Units of the Japan Air Self-Defense Force